Chicks in White Satin is a 1993 American short documentary film directed by Elaine Holliman and was nominated for an Academy Award for Best Documentary Short.

Summary
The film is about a Jewish same-sex marriage of two lesbians, including interviews with the Rabbi and various family members.

Accolades
Academy Award nomination for Best Documentary Short Subject.

See also
1993 in film
List of LGBT-related films

References

External links

Chicks in White Satin on its official YouTube channel
Chicks in White Satin on MUBI

1993 films
1993 documentary films
1993 independent films
1993 LGBT-related films
American short documentary films
American independent films
Documentary films about lesbians
Documentary films about LGBT and Judaism
Documentary films about same-sex marriage in the United States
1990s English-language films
1990s American films
American LGBT-related short films